Apicystis is a genus of parasitic alveolates of the phylum Apicomplexa.

Taxonomy

There is one species currently recognised in this genus.

History

This species in this genus was first described by Liu in 1974 as a species in the genus Mattesia.

In 1996, Lipa and Triggiani transferred this organism, to a new genus Apicystis on the basis of morphology and life cycle.

Description

The species in this genus are spread by the orofaecal route.

Oocysts are ingested. Within the intestine these develop into sporozoites.

The sporozoites penetrate the gut wall and invade the haemocoele subsequently taking up residence in the fat body.

Host records

This genus infects a number of hosts

References

Apicomplexa genera
Parasites of bees